Tyrannus Apostolic Church is a South African Pentecostal church founded in 2000 by Simon Mokoena.

History
The church was founded in 2000 in Qwaqwa South South Africa by Apostle Simon Mokoena and expanded to an estimated 1 million members to date.

References

African initiated churches
Christian new religious movements
Pentecostal denominations